Careliopsis is a genus of sea snails, marine gastropod mollusks in the family Pyramidellidae, the pyrams and their allies.

Distribution
 Marine

Species
Species within the genus Careliopsis, include the following:
 Careliopsis bahiensis (Castellanos, 1982)
 Careliopsis carifa (Bartsch, 1915)
 Careliopsis clathratula (Mörch, 1875)
 Careliopsis delicatula Güller & Zelaya, 2019
 Careliopsis flexuosa Saurin, 1962
 Careliopsis modesta (de Folin, 1870)
 Careliopsis rionegrina Güller & Zelaya, 2019
 Careliopsis styliformis (Mörch, 1875)
 Careliopsis sublaevis Saurin, 1958
 Careliopsis tongaensis Peñas & Rolán, 2016
 Careliopsis turgida Güller & Zelaya, 2019
 Careliopsis utdigitulus Peñas & Rolán, 2017
Species brought into synonymy
 Careliopsis bermudensis (Dall & Bartsch, 1911): synonym of Bacteridium bermudense (Dall & Bartsch, 1911)
 Careliopsis densistriata (Nomura, 1936): synonym of Murchisonella densistriata (Nomura, 1936)
 Careliopsis flexuosus [sic]: synonym of Careliopsis flexuosa Saurin, 1962 (original misspelling: incorrect gender ending)
 Careliopsis octona (Guppy, 1896): synonym of Bacteridium resticulum (Dall, 1889)

References

The tribes Eulimellini and Syrnolini., p. 1-304

External links
 To ITIS
 To World Register of Marine Species
 Mörch O.A.L. (1875). Synopsis molluscorum marinorum Indiarum occidentalium imprimis insularum danicarum. Malakozoologische Blätter, 22: 142-184.

Pyramidellidae
Gastropod genera